Benedict Fjord is a fjord in Peary Land, northern Greenland. To the north, the fjord opens into the Lincoln Sea of the Arctic Ocean.

The fjord was named by Robert Peary in honor of New York banker and yachtsman E. C. Benedict, one of the prominent members of the Peary Arctic Club.

Geography
Benedict Fjord is located east of Hunt Fjord with its mouth in the Lincoln sea between Cape Washington and Cape Cannon.

There are two branches at its head, A. Harmsworth Glacier discharges from the Roosevelt Range on the eastern side of the head of Benedict Fjord, and a smaller branch extends southwards from the western flank of the fjord. The fjord is limited by Gertrud Rask Land on its eastern side and Roosevelt Land in the west. Both shores of the fjord are largely glaciated.

See also
List of fjords of Greenland
Peary Land

References

External links
Crossing North Peary Land in Summer 1953
Fjords of Greenland
Peary Land